Rekum may refer to:

Rekum, Bremen, a district of Bremen, Germany

People with that surname
Marinus van Rekum (1884–1955), Dutch tug of war competitor, brother of Willem
Willem van Rekum (1892–1961), Dutch tug of war competitor, brother of Marinus